Gabriel Monteiro is a municipality in the state of São Paulo in Brazil. The population is 2,776 (2020 est.) in an area of 139 km². The elevation is 436 m.

References

Municipalities in São Paulo (state)